Puccinia cacabata is a plant pathogen that causes rust on cotton.

See also
 List of Puccinia species

References

External links
 Index Fungorum
 USDA ARS Fungal Database

Fungal plant pathogens and diseases
Cotton diseases
cacabata
Fungi described in 1925